W. Frahm was a German mathematician who worked on algebraic geometry.

References

19th-century German mathematicians
Year of birth missing
Year of death missing
Place of birth missing